Keep On Dancing or Keep On Dancin' may refer to:

Literature
 Keep On Dancing, an autobiography by Sarah Churchill

Film
 Keep On Dancing (film), a 1988 Hong Kong film starring Michael Chow

Music
 Keep On Dancing (album), a 1983 Australian compilation album
 Keep On Dancin''', a 1974 album by Hamilton Bohannon
 "Keep On Dancing" (The Gentrys song), 1965
 "Keep On Dancin'" (Gary's Gang song), 1979
 "Keep On Dancing" (DJ BoBo song), 1993
 "Keep On Dancing", a song by The Jacksons from The Jacksons "Keep On Dancing" song by Alyssa Rubino, 2011
 "Keep On (Dancin')", a song by Diana Ross on the 1989 album Workin' Overtime "Keep On Dancin", a song by Ellie Goulding from her 2015 album Delirium  "Keep On Dancin' (Let's Go)", a song by Perpetual Motion on the 1998 compilation Now Dance 98''
 "Hella Good", a song by Gwen Stefani which includes the repeated lyrics "keep on dancin'", which is sometimes mistaken for the song's title